Patrick Kalambay (born 6 January 1984) is an Italian former professional footballer, who plays as a midfielder.

Club career
Kalambay has previously played professionally for several teams, most notably Fermana, Lumezzane, Triestina, Como and Ancona (3 times, Ancona Calcio, A.C. Ancona and U.S. Ancona 1905).

After made his professional debut in 2000–01 Serie B season, Kalambay was signed by A.C. Milan in a direct swap with Daniele Daino in July 2002. Kalambay returned to Ancona for a season long loan, however he did not play any game in 2002–03 Serie B.

Amateur career
In February 2011 he left for fellow Eccellenza club Marino, from U.S. Ancona 1905, despite the two teams could not against each other in the league, as they were belonged to different geographical groups: Ancona in Marche and Marino in Lazio. However, he also played the match against his former club Ancona in the Coppa Italia Dilettanti. Both team promoted to Serie D, but Marino was promoted as the runner-up. He renewed his contract at the start of 2011–12 Serie D season. In September 2012 he was signed by Vibonese.

Personal life
He is the son of Sumbu Kalambay, an Italian Zaire-born former world champion boxer.

References

External links 
 Profile at Ancona website  
 Profile at Assocalciatori.it 
 
 

1984 births
Living people
Italian footballers
Association football midfielders
A.C. Ancona players
A.C. Milan players
U.S. Triestina Calcio 1918 players
Como 1907 players
U.S. Vibonese Calcio players
F.C. Lumezzane V.G.Z. A.S.D. players
A.S.D. Città di Marino Calcio players
Serie B players
Sportspeople from the Province of Ancona
Italian people of Democratic Republic of the Congo descent
Italian sportspeople of African descent
Footballers from Marche